Gianfranco Paolucci (born 18 February 1934) is an Italian fencer. He won a silver medal in the team épée event at the 1964 Summer Olympics.

References

1934 births
Living people
Italian male fencers
Olympic fencers of Italy
Fencers at the 1964 Summer Olympics
Fencers at the 1968 Summer Olympics
Olympic silver medalists for Italy
Olympic medalists in fencing
Medalists at the 1964 Summer Olympics